Mine eyes have seen the glory of the coming of the Lord:
He is trampling out the vintage where the grapes of wrath are stored;
He hath loosed the fateful lightning of His terrible swift sword:
His truth is marching on.

-- first stanza of Julia Ward Howe's Battle Hymn of the Republic conceived as both poem and lyrics to a popular tune and first published in February in The Atlantic Monthly

Nationality words link to articles with information on the nation's poetry or literature (for instance, Irish or France).

Events
 February 11 – Dante Gabriel Rossetti, on returning home with Algernon Charles Swinburne after a night on the town, finds his wife, Elizabeth Siddal, dead on the floor from an overdose of laudanum. At her funeral, he places a sheaf of poems (a few years later retrieved) in the coffin.
 Emily Dickinson's year of greatest poetic productivity.

Works published in English

United Kingdom
 Matthew Arnold, On Translating Homer: Last Words, a reply to F. W. Newman's Homeric Translation in Theory and Practice 1861, itself a reply to Arnold's On Translating Homer, published that year
 William Barnes, Poems of Rural Life in the Dorset Dialect: Third Collection (see also 1844, 1869, 1868)
 Elizabeth Barrett Browning, Last Poems, edition prepared by her husband, Robert Browning; posthumously published
 Charles Stuart Calverley, published anonymously, Verses and Translations
 A. H. Clough, Last Poems, published posthumously with a memoir by F. T. Palgrave
 Thomas De Quincey, Recollections of the Lakes and the Lake Poets, first publication of the author's series of biographical essays on the Lake Poets, including William Wordsworth, Samuel Taylor Coleridge and Robert Southey (originally published separately in Tait's Edinburgh Magazine in 1834, 1835, 1839 and 1840; see also Selections Grave and Gay 1854, which includes some of the essays)
 Charles Hindley, writing as Mother Shipton, Mother Shipton's Prophecy, dated 1448
 George Meredith, Modern Love and Poems of the English Roadside
 Coventry Patmore, Victories of Love
 Adelaide A. Procter, A Chaplet of Verses, illustrated by Richard Doyle
 Christina Rossetti, Goblin Market and Other Poems (see also Poems 1890)
 Joseph Skipsey, Poems, Songs and Ballads

United States
 Oliver Wendell Holmes:
 Songs in Many Keys
 The Poems of Oliver Wendell Holmes
 Julia Ward Howe, "The Battle Hymn of the Republic", published in The Atlantic Monthly, February
 William Ross Wallace, The Liberty Bell
 John Greenleaf Whittier, The Furnace Blast

Other in English
 Charles Harpur, A Poet's Home, verse pamphlet, Australia
 Henry Kendall, Poems and Songs, Australia

Works published in other languages
 Aleardo Aleardi, Canto politico ("Political Songs"), Italy
 Charles Baudelaire, Petits poèmes en prose, France
 Dalpatram, editor, Kavhadohan, an anthology of Gujarati-language poetry (India)
 Leconte de Lisle, Poèmes barbares, France
 Henrik Ibsen, Terje Vigen, Norway

Births
Death years link to the corresponding "[year] in poetry" article:
 January 10 – Hoshino Tenchi 星野天知 (died 1950), Japanese Meiji period poet and martial arts master; a co-founder of Bungakukai literary magazine; 8th Grand Master and a teacher of the Yagyu Shinkage-ryu martial-arts school (surname: Hoshino)
 January 12 – Edith Emma Cooper, half of "Michael Field" (died 1913), English
 January 24 – Edith Wharton (died 1937), American fiction writer
 c. January 28 – Ella Rhoads Higginson (died 1940), American
 February 17 – Mori Ōgai 森 鷗外 / 森 鴎外 (died 1922) Japanese physician, translator, novelist and poet (surname: Mori)
 March 2 – John Jay Chapman (died 1923), American writer
 April 24 – A. C. Benson (died 1925), English
 May 22 – John Kendrick Bangs (died 1922), American
 June 6 – Sir Henry Newbolt (died 1938), English
 June 18 – Carolyn Wells (died 1942), American novelist and poet
 August 2 – Duncan Campbell Scott (died 1947), Canadian
 September 28 – W. T. Goodge (died 1909), Australian
 October 29 – John Bernard O'Hara (died 1927), Australian
 November 4 – Jean Blewett (died 1934), Canadian
 November 5 – Thomas William Heney (died 1928), Australian

Deaths
Birth years link to the corresponding "[year] in poetry" article:
 February 11 – Elizabeth Siddall (born 1829), English artist, artist's model and poet, wife of Dante Gabriel Rossetti; from an opium overdose
 February 14 – Emily Rebecca Page (born 1834), American poet and editor
 February 21 – Justinus Kerner (born 1786), German poet of the Swabian school and physician
 February 24 – Bernhard Severin Ingemann (born 1789), Danish poet, playwright and historical novelist
 March 13 – Roderick Flanagan (born 1828), Australian
 May 6 – Henry David Thoreau (born 1817), American author, poet, naturalist, tax resister, development critic, surveyor, historian, philosopher and leading transcendentalist; from tuberculosis
 August 23 – Friedrich Julius Hammer (born 1810), German poet
 date not known – Gopala Krishna Pattanayak (born 1785), Indian, Oriya-language poet

See also

 19th century in poetry
 19th century in literature
 List of years in poetry
 List of years in literature
 Victorian literature
 French literature of the 19th century
 Poetry

Notes

Poetry
19th-century poetry